(born September 15, 1972) is a Japanese author. Most of his works are literary fiction or speculative fiction.

Biography
EnJoe was born on 1972 in Sapporo.  He graduated from the physics department of Tohoku University, then went on to the graduate school at University of Tokyo and received Ph.D. for a mathematical physical study on the natural languages.  He worked as a post-doc researcher at several research institutes for seven years, then abandoned the academic career in 2007 and found a job at a software firm, which he left in 2008 to become a full-time writer.

Works 
In 2006, he submitted his science fiction novel Self-Reference ENGINE, made up of a number of related short works, to be considered for the Komatsu Sakyō Award. It was a finalist. It was published the following year by Hayakawa Shobō. In the same year, his short story "Obu za bēsbōru" ("Of the Baseball") won the contest of literary magazine Bungakukai, which became his debut in literary fiction.

His literary fiction work is often dense with allusions. Numerous annotations were added to "Uyūshitan" when it was published in book form in 2009, with none appearing in its initial magazine publication. EnJoe's science fiction works often employ mathematical motifs. The narrator of "Boy's Surface" (2007) is a morphism, and the title is a reference to a geometrical notion. In "Moonshine" (2009), natural numbers are sentient through a savant's mind's eye in a field of the monster group.

Project Itoh's Genocidal Organ was also a finalist of Komatsu Sakyō Award contest. It was published from Hayakawa Shobō in 2007, along with Enjoe's Self-Reference ENGINE. Subsequently, they often appeared together at science fiction conventions and conducting interviews, and collaborated in a few works. Itoh died of cancer in 2009. At the press conference after the announcement of Enjoe's Akutagawa Prize in January 2012, he revealed the plan to complete Itoh's unfinished novel Shisha no teikoku. It was published in August 2012 and received the Special Award of Nihon SF Taisho.

Awards

Japanese
 2010: Noma Prize for New Writers for Uyūshitan
 2012: Akutagawa Prize for "Dōkeshi no chō (Harlequin's Butterfly)"
 2012: Nihon SF Taisho Special Award for Shisha no teikoku (The Empire of Corpses) (with Project Itoh)
 2013: Seiun Award Japanese Long Form for Shisha no teikoku (with Project Itoh)
 2017:  for "Mojika"
 2018: Nihon SF Taisho for Mojika

US
 2014: Philip K. Dick Award Special Citation for Self-Reference ENGINE

Works

Translated into English

English translations (book length)
 Self-Reference ENGINE (Terry Gallagher (trans.), Haikasoru/VIZ Media, 2013); translation of Self-Reference ENGINE (2007, 2010)

Short fiction in English translation
 "Freud" (excerpt from Self-Reference ENGINE) (Speculative Japan 2, Kurodahan Press, 2011)
 "Silverpoint" (Japan Earthquake Charity Literature, Waseda Bungaku, 2011)
 "Meditations on Green" (Monkey Business, Volume 2, A Public Space, 2012)
 "Endoastronomy" (The Future Is Japanese, Haikasoru/VIZ Media, 2012)
 "The History of the Decline and Fall of the Galactic Empire" (Words Without Borders, July 2012 )
 "Harlequin's Butterfly" (Excerpt) (Asymptote, Jan 2013 )
 "Time in "Time"" (essay) (Monkey Business, Volume 3, A Public Space, 2013)
 "Printable" (Granta, Issue 127, Granta Publications, 2014)
 "A Record of My Grandmother" (Monkey Business, Volume 4, A Public Space, 2014)
 "List, Combination, Recursion" (essay) (The Battle Royale Slam Book, Haikasoru/VIZ Media, 2014)
 "Time Together" (2014 PEN World Voices Online Anthology, PEN American Center, 2014) 
 "Three Twitter Stories" (2014 PEN World Voices Online Anthology, PEN American Center, 2014) 
 "First Sentence" (essay) (Granta Online Edition, 7 May 2014, Granta Publications, 2014) 
 "Twelve Twitter Stories" (Monkey Business, Volume 5, A Public Space, 2015)
 "The Squirrel Awakes" (Kindle Single, 2015)
 "Overdrive" (Saiensu Fikushon 2016, Haikasoru/VIZ Media, 2016)
 "Shuffle Drive" (Monkey Business, Volume 7, A Public Space, 2017)
"Shadow.net" (The Ghost in the Shell: Five New Short Stories, Vertical/Media Tie In, 2017)

Scripts
 "I'm Never Remembering You, Baby" (Space Dandy episode 11, 2014) – writer
 "An Other-Dimensional Tale, Baby" (Space Dandy episode 24, 2014) – writer, guest character design
 Godzilla Singular Point (2021) – writer, series composition

Reception 
An interviewer in the literary journal Asymptote wrote, "Toh EnJoe's stories are known for their scientific lucidity and literary impenetrability. His language and his writing style, however, belie his background as a physicist: topics woven into his stories include science, but also linguistics, literary theory, and philosophical approaches to the imagination. His complicated narrative structures are the subject of heated discussions and have even evoked harsh reviews calling his work 'indigestible', 'sleep-inducing,' and 'reader-unfriendly'."

Notes

External links 
 
 Interview by Sayuri Okamoto (Asymptote, Jan 2013)
 INTERVIEW: Toh EnJoe, Author of Self-Reference ENGINE (SF Signal)
 J'Lit | Authors : Toh EnJoe | Books from Japan 
 Excerpt and synopsis of The Empire of Corpses
 

1972 births
Japanese science fiction writers
Japanese male short story writers
Postmodern writers
Akutagawa Prize winners
People from Sapporo
Writers from Hokkaido
Living people